Greenwold, also known as the Manlove Hayes House, is a historic home located at Dover, Kent County, Delaware. It was built in 1863, and consists of a -story center hall plan main house with a rear service wing.  The main house is a five bay wide, stuccoed structure.  It has a cross-gable roof with a bracketed cornice.  The house features a full width verandah.  The property retains much of its original landscaping.

It was added to the National Register of Historic Places in 1973.

References

External links 

Historic American Buildings Survey in Delaware
Houses on the National Register of Historic Places in Delaware
Houses completed in 1863
Houses in Dover, Delaware
National Register of Historic Places in Dover, Delaware